Carolina is a 2001 album by Seu Jorge. Originally known as Samba Esporte Fino when released in Brazil in 2001, it was retitled Carolina and released internationally in 2003. This is Seu Jorge's first international album after having debuted in Brazil with Moro no Brasil in 1998.

Track listing

References

Seu Jorge albums
2001 albums